The Kindergarten Teacher is a 2018 American drama film directed by Sara Colangelo. It is based on the 2014 Israeli film of the same name. It stars Maggie Gyllenhaal, Parker Sevak, Anna Baryshnikov,  Rosa Salazar, Michael Chernus and Gael García Bernal. The film had its world premiere at the Sundance Film Festival on January 19, 2018. It was released on October 12, 2018, by Netflix in the United States and Canada.

Plot
Lisa Spinelli, a kindergarten teacher from Staten Island, is struggling with feelings of dissatisfaction in her life. She is in a loving yet passionless marriage with her husband Grant, and her teenage children, Josh and Lainie, are distant with her. Lisa attends a poetry class every week, led by Simon, but her poetry is dismissed as derivative. One of Lisa's students, Jimmy, is routinely picked up late from school by his babysitter. One day, Lisa overhears Jimmy reciting a poem he wrote while he was waiting to be picked up. Lisa reads the poem at her poetry class, where her classmates and Simon are struck by it and compliment Lisa on her talent. Lisa decides that Jimmy is a prodigy, and begins to dedicate her time to nurturing his talent.

Lisa asks Jimmy's babysitter, a part-time actress named Becca, to write down the poems that Jimmy recites. Becca complies, but Lisa begins to feel that Becca treats Jimmy like a baby and that she is obstructing his ability to grow into his talent. Lisa gives Jimmy her phone number and tells him to call her any time that he has a poem. Simon invites Lisa to meet him, and tells her about a poetry reading in Manhattan, where she will have to read two of her poems in front of an audience. Lisa and Simon have sex, with Simon's attraction to Lisa being a by-product of what he believes to be her unique artistic genius.

Lisa meets Jimmy's father Nikhil and tells him about Jimmy's poetry. Although Nikhil is happy about his son's intellect, he wants Jimmy to have a normal, practical life. Lisa encourages Nikhil to fire Becca and offers to watch Jimmy for a few hours after school every day, which Nikhil gratefully accepts. One night, despite Nikhil's request that Jimmy be taken to baseball practice, Lisa takes him to the poetry reading instead, where his poetry is well received. Simon, however, is upset that Lisa lied about writing the poetry, and tells her to leave the class. Lisa and Jimmy return home late, and Lisa puts Jimmy to bed on her couch. The next day, Nikhil calls Lisa, angry at her for lying about the poetry reading and for not bringing him home afterwards, and informs her he will be taking Jimmy to another kindergarten.

The next morning, Lisa goes to Jimmy's house, and follows him to his new kindergarten, where she kidnaps him. They drive to a motel near a beach up north, where Lisa tells Jimmy of her plan to go across the border into Canada. Jimmy appears to be compliant with her plan, but while she's in the shower, he calls 911 and tells them he's been kidnapped. Lisa attempts to dissuade him, telling him that the world will never understand his talent, but gives Jimmy the address of their motel anyway while sobbing quietly in the bathroom. The police arrive and presumably arrest Lisa; they place Jimmy in the front seat of a squad car, where he says "I have a poem" but nobody hears him.

Cast

Production
In May 2017, it was announced Maggie Gyllenhaal had been cast in the film, with Sara Colangelo directing from a screenplay she wrote, based upon the 2014 Israeli film of the same name. Trudie Styler, Celine Rattray, Gyllenhaal, Osnat Handelsman-Keren and Talia Kleinhendler will serve as producers on the film, under their Maven Pictures and Pie Films banners, respectively. In July 2017, Gael García Bernal, Rosa Salazar, Michael Chernus, Anna Baryshnikov, Daisy Tahan and Samrat Chakrabarti joined the cast of the film. Poets Kaveh Akbar, Dominique Townsend, and Ocean Vuong worked with Gyllenhaal and Colangelo to write poems for the film.

Release
The film had its world premiere at the Sundance Film Festival on January 19, 2018. It was screened in the U.S. Dramatic Competition section at the 2018 Sundance Film Festival. Shortly after, Netflix acquired distribution rights to the film in the United States and Canada.  It was released on October 12, 2018. It was screened at the Toronto International Film Festival on September 6, 2018. The film's international distribution is handled by Protagonist Pictures and Thunderbird Releasing in the United Kingdom.

Reception
 The website's critical consensus reads, "Elevated by a bravura performance from Maggie Gyllenhaal, The Kindergarten Teacher is one American remake that retains its impact the second time around." On Metacritic, the film has a weighted average score of 75 out of 100, based on 21 critics, indicating "generally favorable reviews".

Accolades

References

External links
 

2018 films
2018 drama films
American drama films
Films produced by Trudie Styler
English-language Netflix original films
American remakes of Israeli films
Films about educators
Films about teacher–student relationships
Films about poets
Films about friendship
2010s English-language films
2010s American films
2018 independent films